The Nikola Tesla Museum is a science museum located in the central area of Belgrade, Serbia. It is dedicated to honoring and displaying the life and work of Nikola Tesla as well as the final resting place for Tesla. It holds more than 160,000 original documents, over 2,000 books and journals, over 1,200 historical technical exhibits, over 1,500 photographs and photo plates of original, technical objects, instruments and apparatus, and over 1,000 plans and drawings. Very little is on display in the small ground floor exhibition space.

The Nikola Tesla Archive was inscribed on UNESCO's Memory of the World Programme Register in 2003 due to its critical role regarding history of electrification of the world and future technological advancements in this area.

History
The Nikola Tesla Museum is housed in a residential villa built in 1927 according to the designs of Dragiša Brašovan, a distinguished Serbian architect. The building was used for various purposes until December 5, 1952, when the Nikola Tesla Museum was founded in accordance with the decision of the Government of the Federal People's Republic of Yugoslavia. Certain items for the museum were shipped from New York City to Belgrade, Yugoslavia, on September 7, 1951, as a result of efforts by Sava Kosanović, Tesla's nephew and closest relative and his attorney Philip Wittenberg.

Exhibitions
The permanent exhibition was arranged in 1955. It consists of four rooms on the ground floor. From time to time there have been some modifications, but for many years the basic concept has remained the same. Its first part is primarily a memorial exhibition, while the second part is an interactive one, with 3D computer generated models of Tesla's inventions. From time to time, the museum organizes thematic exhibitions of documents, photographs and other material in order to display some periods from Tesla's inventive life.

Reconstruction
Reconstruction of the Nikola Tesla Museum started on November 3, 2006. The first phase of the project was scheduled to have been complete by the end of 2006. The garden on the roof of the museum was designed to be enclosed by glass windows, which would turn the roof into a computer room. This reconstruction is now complete, and the museum is available to visit.

Gallery

See also
Nikola Tesla Memorial Center, museum in Smiljan, Croatia
Nikola Tesla
Wardenclyffe tower
Wireless energy transmission
Tesla Science Center at Wardenclyffe

References

External links

 

Nikola Tesla
Science museums
Museums in Belgrade
Museums established in 1952
1952 establishments in Serbia
Vračar